Tyrimnus is a genus of Mediterranean plants in the tribe Cardueae within the family Asteraceae.

The only known species is Tyrimnus leucographus, native to the Mediterranean region of southern Europe, North Africa, and the Middle East.

References

Monotypic Asteraceae genera
Cynareae